Charles J. Ciprich (born November 30, 1941) is an American former racing driver from Sayre, Pennsylvania.  A successful modified stock car racer who won numerous championships throughout the northeast, Ciprich tried his hand at Championship Car racing in 1983 and 1984.  He first attempted to qualify for the 1983 Indianapolis 500 in an unsophisticated Chevrolet powered Finley chassis fielded by Pace Racing.  He made his CART Champ Car debut later that year at Pocono Raceway but qualified near the back of the field and was knocked out after 38 laps by a transmission failure. Ciprich and the Pace team arrived for the first oval race of the 1984 season at Phoenix International Raceway with a more advanced, yet year-old March-Cosworth combination yet failed to make the field.  Their attempt to qualify the car for the 1984 Indianapolis 500 was equally unsuccessful and Ciprich returned to Modifieds.  Ciprich retired some years later and now resides in Florida.

References

1941 births
Champ Car drivers
Living people
People from Sayre, Pennsylvania
Racing drivers from Pennsylvania